Ganddal Station is a railway station in the western part of the municipality of Sandnes in Rogaland county, Norway. The station is located just south of the centre of the city of Sandnes in the Ganddal borough. It sits along the Sørlandet Line with long-distance service to Stavanger to the north and Kristiansand to the southeast. The station is also served by the Jæren Commuter Rail with local service between Stavanger and Egersund. The station is simply a shelter and it has no bathrooms, food services, or ticket counters.

History
The Ålgård Line splits off from the main Sørlandet Line at Ganddal, but passenger traffic was terminated in 1955 and freight traffic ended in 1988. The station has been in use here since 1 March 1878 when the Sørlandet Line opened.  The station was first named Høiland from 1 March 1878 until 1 July 1917 when it was renamed Ganddalen.  In April 1921, it was shortened to Ganddal.

References

Railway stations on the Sørlandet Line
Railway stations in Sandnes
Railway stations opened in 1880
1880 establishments in Norway